Romeo contra Julieta ("Romeo Against Juliet") is a 1968 Mexican film. It was written by Luis Alcoriza and stars Angelica Maria.

External links
 

1968 films
Mexican romantic comedy films
1960s Spanish-language films
1960s Mexican films